A lithium vanadium phosphate (LVP) battery  is a proposed type of lithium ion battery that uses a vanadium phosphate in the cathode.   they have not been commercialized.

Research 
Vanadium phosphates have been investigated as potential cathodes for Li-ion batteries: including lithium vanadium phosphate, Li3V2(PO4)3; the same material prepared by sol gel methods showed lithium insertion/removal over a 3.5 to 4.1 V range, with evidence of three stages of insertion/removal.

ɛ-VOPO4 has been studied as a cathode material and has a two stage lithium insertion/removal process. Nanostructured ɛ-VOPO4 has been studied as a potential redox material.

References

Lithium-ion batteries
Phosphates
Vanadium